Chapman Farmhouse is a historic home located at Duanesburg in Schenectady County, New York. It was built about 1832 and is a -story, five-bay frame building on a slightly raised stone foundation in a late-Federal / early-Greek Revival style.  It features a gable roof with cornice returns, a wide frieze, narrow corner boards, and clapboard siding.  Also on the property is a contributing barn.

The property was covered in a 1984 study of Duanesburg historical resources.
It was listed on the National Register of Historic Places in 1984.

References

Houses on the National Register of Historic Places in New York (state)
Houses in Schenectady County, New York
Federal architecture in New York (state)
Greek Revival houses in New York (state)
Houses completed in 1832
National Register of Historic Places in Schenectady County, New York